The 2000 North Texas Mean Green football team represented the University of North Texas in the 2000 NCAA Division I-A football season. The Mean Green played their home games at the Fouts Field in Denton, Texas, and competed in the Big West Conference. They were led by third-year head coach Darrell Dickey. The team finished their regular season 3-8 overall and 1-4 in Big West play. They did not qualify for a bowl game for the 40th straight season

Previous season
North Texas barely improved on their 1999 record, winning just one more game than the previous season's 2-9 mark.

Schedule

References

North Texas
North Texas Mean Green football seasons
North Texas Mean Green football